Disney Channel is the Dutch edition based on the American channel of the same name, owned by the Walt Disney Company. The channel is broadcasting free-to-cable, and all content is dubbed in Dutch. The channel features a mix of original sitcoms, teen drama series, animation movies and original movies (presented as DCOMs). English audio is also available on the operators Ziggo, Canal Digitaal, TV Vlaanderen, Caiway, Proximus and Telenet. There are two different versions with local advertisements. While currently not using a slogan, the tagline 'Dat moet je meemaken!' (English: 'You have got to experience this!') has been used in the past.

Since 2012, a dedicated version is proposed for Belgium (except on satellite).

History
The channel first launched on UPC Netherlands on 3 October 2009. On 30 October 2009 it launched in Flanders on Telenet and Belgacom. On 22 June 2010 it was added to analogue. In September 2011 the Playhouse Disney block became Disney Junior. On 1 September 2011 it launched on Ziggo. The channel was scheduled for a release on Caiway in October 2011, but that has been cancelled.

In early 2012 hours were expanded and a new logo was adopted. On 16 August 2012 it launched on CanalDigitaal and TV Vlaanderen at Astra 23.5 East. In July 2013 subtitled programs were moved to late night. In October 2013 subtitled programs were moved to the weekend nights. On 1 April 2014, Disney Channel started transmitting with dual audio channels (Dutch and Original). There are standard no Dutch subtitles, however in most cases subtitles can be activated with text page 888.

Disney Channel, Disney XD 24 hours and Disney Junior became available on KPN Interactive TV and on KPN's subsidiary Telfort on 2 April 2014. However, the Disney channels are solely in Dutch dub on these two operators. It is currently unknown when the original English audio channel will become available on KPN.

From 25 March 2015 Disney Channel HD and Disney XD HD is available at KPN, XS4All and Telfort.

From 1 July 2015 Disney Channel HD, Disney XD 24 and Disney Junior become available through Caiway and Caiway Albrandswaard. However, in Albrandswaard only the SD version of Disney Channel is available.

On 2 November 2015 Disney Channel is available through KPNs web IPTV service KPN Play however it was sooner available for the Play beta testers.

On 1 April 2019, Disney Junior closed in the Netherlands.

Programming

Current

Animated series 
An asterisk (*) means that the program is a acquired programming

Live-action series

Disney Junior 
 Alice's Wonderland Bakery (2022-present)
 Mira, Royal Detective (2020-present)
 PJ Masks (2015-present)
 Puppy Dog Pals (22 January 2018-present)
 The Chicken Squad (2021-present)
 T.O.T.S. (2019-present)
 Spidey and His Amazing Friends (2021-present)
 Mickey Mouse Funhouse (2021-present)

Former
An asterisk (*) indicates that the program is an acquired programming

Live-action series 
 Shake It Up (8 March 2011 – 20 December 2013)
 Mister Maker* (3 October 2009 – present)
 Hannah Montana (3 October 2009 – 2 June 2011)
 Wizards of Waverly Place (3 October 2009 – 11 November 2012)
 Sonny with A Chance (18 January 2010 – 27 April 2011)
 So Random! (30 January 2012-September 2012)
 The Suite Life on Deck (17 December 2010 – 27 October 2012)
 The Suite Life of Zack & Cody (3 October 2009 – 3 December 2010)
 Groove High* (4 October 2009 – 6 January 2012)
 Art Attack (10 September 2011 – present)
 My Babysitter's a Vampire* (3 October 2011 – 1 March 2013)
 Lightning Point* (25 June 2012 – 2013)
 Zoomix*
 Really Me*
 Bia (TV series)*
 Good Luck Charlie
 A.N.T. Farm
 Jessie (2012-2022)
 Austin & Ally
 Dog With a Blog
 Violetta*
 Liv and Maddie (2012-2022)
 I Didn't Do It
 Girl Meets World
 K.C. Undercover
 Soy Luna*
 Once (TV series)*

Animated series
 Esme & Roy* (26 August 2018 – present)
 Totally Spies*
 The Replacements (2009-2010)
 Recess* 
 Mermaid Melody Pichi Pichi Pitch* 
 The Weekenders* 
 Kim Possible 
 American Dragon: Jake Long (1 November 2009 - 2011)
 The Emperor's New School (2009 - 2012)
 W.I.T.C.H.* 
 Famous 5: On the Case* 
 A Kind Of Magic* 
 Jacob Two-Two* (10 June 2009 - 2010)
 The Legend of Tarzan* 
 Lilo & Stitch: The Series 
 Dave the Barbarian 
 DuckTales* 
 DuckTales (2017 TV series) (2017-2022)
 Chip 'n Dale Rescue Rangers* 
 Timon & Pumbaa* 
 101 Dalmatians: The Series* 
 Brandy & Mr. Whiskers 
 The Buzz on Maggie 
 Jimmy Two-Shoes* 
 Casper's Scare School* 
 Braceface* (2009-2013)
 Stoked* 
 Pat & Stan* 
 Wunschpunsch* (2011-2013)
 The Tofus* (2009-2016)
 The Kids from Room 402* 
 Monster High*
 Shin Chan* (2015, reruns)
 Phineas and Ferb (2009–2022)
 Fish Hooks
 Gravity Falls (2013-2022)
 Wander Over Yonder
 Star vs. The Forces of Evil
 LoliRock
 Chloe's Closet
 The ZhuZhus
 Winx Club*
 The DaVincibles*

Disney Junior
 Sponk!
 Doc McStuffins (2012–2022)
 Handy Manny
 Henry Hugglemonster
 Jake and the Never Land Pirates
 Jungle Junction
 Little Einsteins
 Martha Speaks
 Mickey Mouse Clubhouse
 Musti
 Sofia the First
 Lalaloopsy

References

Logos

External links

 Official site (Netherlands)
 Official site (Flanders)
 Disney Channel NL on YouTube
 Disney Channel FL on YouTube

Netherlands and Flanders
Television channels in the Netherlands
Television channels in Flanders
Television channels in Belgium
Television channels and stations established in 2009
2009 establishments in Belgium
2009 establishments in the Netherlands